Olga Gnedovskaya (born August 15, 1989) is an Uzbekistani former swimmer, who specialized in backstroke events. Gnedovskaya qualified for the women's 100 m backstroke, as Uzbekistan's youngest swimmer (aged 14), at the 2004 Summer Olympics in Athens. She cleared a FINA B-standard entry time of 1:05.42 from the Russian Championships in Moscow. She challenged seven other swimmers in heat two, including Kazakhstan's Anastassiya Prilepa, who shared the same age with Gnedovskaya. She rounded out the field to last place in 1:15.33, nearly 10 seconds off her entry time. Gnedovskaya failed to advance into the semifinals, as she placed forty-first overall in the preliminaries.

References

External links

NBC 2008 Olympics profile

1989 births
Living people
Sportspeople from Tashkent
Uzbekistani people of Russian descent
Uzbekistani female backstroke swimmers
Olympic swimmers of Uzbekistan
Swimmers at the 2004 Summer Olympics
Swimmers at the 2006 Asian Games
Asian Games competitors for Uzbekistan
20th-century Uzbekistani women
21st-century Uzbekistani women